Beatle Quest is a text adventure video game developed and published by Number 9 Software. Written by Garry Marsh, the game was developed using The Quill software program. It was released for the Commodore 64 and ZX Spectrum computers in 1985.

Beatle Quest received mixed reception from video game critics. The game was commercially successful, debuting at number five on Commodore Users sales charts. Beatle Quest was originally going be the first game in a trilogy but the plans were abandoned.

Gameplay

Beatle Quest is a text adventure video game.

Development
Beatle Quest was developed and published by Number 9 Software. Garry Marsh wrote the game using The Quill programme and was given permission from ATV Music to use the lyrics from Beatles songs. A fan of The Beatles, Marsh drew inspiration from the band's lyrics to develop the games story and design. The cover art to the game was illustrated by Alan Aldridge. The game was released for Commodore 64 in 1985 and was sold through mail order.

Reception

Beatle Quest received mixed reception from video game critics. Crash praised the game for being well crafted and atmospheric for its subject matter. Your Sinclair, while positive about the game's graphics, felt that the game would be difficult to get into for those not fans of The Beatles. A reviewer for Home Computing Weekly called the game good but nothing special. Simon Marsh for Computer and Video Games gave the game a scathing review. While not being a fan of The Beatles, he criticized the game for its depiction of drug use as a form of humor and overall gave it a rating of zero.

Beatle Quest was commercially successful, debuting at number five on Commodore Users sales charts. Marsh had made and sold 500 copies of the game. The success prompted Marsh to negotiate development of the next two games in the trilogy, provisionally titled A Day in the Life and Across the Universe. While Marsh had started on the second game, the planned trilogy was abandoned.

References

External links
 

 

1985 video games
1980s interactive fiction
Adventure games
Band-centric video games
Commodore 64 games
Video games about virtual reality
Video games developed in the United Kingdom
Video games set in the 30th century
ZX Spectrum games